Cavalier Rural Electric Cooperative is a public utility cooperative based in Langdon, North Dakota.  It serves as the electric distribution utility in a portion of northeast North Dakota, mainly within Cavalier and northern Ramsey counties, and its power supplier is Minnkota Power Cooperative.

The territory currently encompassing Cavalier REC's system was created from portions of two neighboring cooperatives, Baker Electric Cooperative (now part of Northern Plains Electric Cooperative) and Nodak Electric Cooperative. Cavalier is one of the smallest electric cooperatives serving North Dakota, and is the only one that currently does not have its own website.

External links
Cavalier REC contact page at Minnkota Power site 

Electric cooperatives in North Dakota
Electric power companies of the United States